Lushomo Mweemba (born 10 April 2001) is a Zambian footballer who plays as a defender for Green Buffaloes WFC and the Zambia women's national team. She competed for Zambia at the 2018 Africa Women Cup of Nations, playing in three matches.

References

External links

2001 births
Living people
Zambian women's footballers
Women's association football midfielders
Nkwazi F.C. players
Zambia women's international footballers
Footballers at the 2020 Summer Olympics
Olympic footballers of Zambia